Tremandra is a genus of flowering plants in the family Elaeocarpaceae. It contains two species, both endemic to Western Australia.

Description
The leaves are simple, flat, heart or egg-shaped and may be rounded at the base. The mature leaves are smooth or covered with soft hairs on the upper surface, the underside covered in fine, soft hairs. The leaf margins are flat and scalloped. The single flowers are borne on a thread-like peduncle in leaf axils with 5 small to medium sized bracts. The sepals and petals are whorled around the centre floral receptacle.

Taxonomy and naming
The genus Tremandra was first formally described in 1824 by Augustin Pyramus de Candolle from an unpublished description by Robert Brown and de Candolle's description was published in Prodromus Systematis Naturalis Regni Vegetabilis. The specific epithet (Tremandra) is derived from the Greek for "hole" and "anther", referring to the anthers bursting open through a hole.

Species list
The following species names are accepted by the Australian Plant Census as at January 2020:
 Tremandra diffusa  R.Br ex DC.;
 Tremandra stelligera R.Br ex DC..

Distribution
Both species of Tremandra are found in the south-west of Western Australia.

References

 
Elaeocarpaceae genera
Flora of Australia
Rosids of Western Australia